Ragueneau is a parish municipality in Quebec, Canada, on Outardes Bay on the north shore of the Saint Lawrence River.

History
The first settlers arrived in 1920, mostly from Saint-Paul-du-Nord, Les Escoumins, and Sainte-Anne-de-Portneuf. That same year, Ragueneau Township was proclaimed and named after Jesuit Paul Ragueneau (1608-1680). In 1926, its post office opened.

Three communities developed concurrently along the shores of the Saint Lawrence: Rivière-à-la-Truite in the north-east, Ruisseau-Vert in the centre, and Ragueneau in the south-west. The main administrative, commercial, cultural, and religious activities concentrated in Ruisseau-Vert, so that over time this community became known as Ragueneau itself. In 1951, the Parish Municipality of Ragueneau was incorporated.

Demographics 

Population trend:
 Population in 2011: 1405 (2006 to 2011 population change: -7.6%)
 Population in 2006: 1520
 Population in 2001: 1584
 Population in 1996: 1684
 Population in 1991: 1722

Mother tongue:
 English as first language: 0%
 French as first language: 97.7%
 English and French as first language: 0%
 Other as first language: 2.3%

References

Parish municipalities in Quebec
Incorporated places in Côte-Nord